RSM-167 is a reserved Constituency of the Provincial Assembly of Sindh. It is currently held by Diwan Chand Chawla

General elections 2013

General elections 2008

See also

 Sindh

References

External links 
 Official Website of Government of Sindh

Constituencies of Sindh